BAS may stand for:

 Bachelor of Applied Science (B.AS or BAS)
 Bachelor of Arts and Science (B.A.S.)
 Bank of America Securities
 Basaa language, ISO 639-2 and -3 language code bas
 Basic Allowance for Subsistence in United States Military Pay
 Battalion Aid Station, US military
 Bay St. Louis station, station code BAS
 Befreiungsausschuss Südtirol (South Tyrolean Liberation Committee)
 Behavioural Activation System in Gray's biopsychological theory of personality
 Belt alternator starter, or BAS hybrid
 Bere Alston railway station, National Rail station code BAS
 Bergen Arkitekt Skole (Bergen School of Architecture)
 Biblical Archaeology Society, publisher of the BAS Library series
 Book of Alternative Services of the Anglican Church of Canada
 Brake assist system in an automobile
 British Antarctic Survey
 British Art Show
 Broadcast auxiliary service
 Brussels American School
 Building automation system
 Bulgarian Academy of Sciences
 Business Activity Statement, an Australian Taxation Office form

See also
 Bas (disambiguation)
 Bass (disambiguation)